Admiral Sir Charles Henry Lawrence Woodhouse KCB (9 July 1893 – 23 September 1978) was an officer of the Royal Navy.

Naval career
Woodhouse joined the Royal Navy in 1906. He served in World War I and specialized in gunnery. In 1935 he was appointed Assistant Director of Naval Equipment at the Admiralty.

He captained  in the Battle of the River Plate in December 1939. In March 1944 he went on to be Director of Naval Ordnance at the Admiralty.

After the War he became Rear-Admiral, Aircraft Carriers and in 1948 he was made Commander-in-Chief, East Indies; he retired in 1950.

In popular culture
In the 1956 film The Battle of the River Plate, Woodhouse was played by Ian Hunter.

References

External links

1893 births
1978 deaths
Knights Commander of the Order of the Bath
Royal Navy admirals
Royal Navy officers of World War II
People from Retford
Military personnel from Nottinghamshire